Baćin is a village in the Sisak-Moslavina County in the central part of Croatia. It is in the Una Valley near the border with Bosnia and Herzegovina. Baćin is a dormitory village with a resident population of just over 200 people.

See also 

 Baćin massacre

References

Hrvatska Dubica
Bosnia and Herzegovina–Croatia border crossings
Populated places in Sisak-Moslavina County